Archy may refer to:
Archy (software), a software system
Archy (character), fictional cockroach of Archy and Mehitabel
Sir Archy (1805–1833), American Thoroughbred racehorse

See also
Archie (disambiguation)
Archy Kirkwood, a British politician
Archy Lee, an African-American born into slavery in Mississippi
Archy Marshall, a British musician better known as King Krule
Archy McNally, title character in a series of novels by Lawrence Sanders